Municipal elections were held on Wednesday 3 March 2010 in most municipalities in the Netherlands. This election determined the composition of the municipal councils for the following four years. The elections were held a few weeks after the fall of the Fourth Balkenende cabinet.

Nearly 24% of the vote went to local parties and independent candidates, more than any national political party. The Labour Party remained the most popular party overall, despite a significant decline in their vote share. The Party for Freedom only contested the cities of Almere and The Hague, where it became the largest and second-largest party respectively in both cities. Support for the CDA also decreased, while the VVD made moderate gains and Democrats 66 nearly doubled their support. The CDA held the most seats of any party, mainly due to its higher level of support in rural areas.

Results

Local elections in the Netherlands
Municipal
Netherlands